Eryon is an extinct genus of decapod crustaceans from the Late Jurassic of Germany. Its remains are known from the Solnhofen limestone.

References

External links

Polychelida
Jurassic crustaceans
Solnhofen fauna
Fossil taxa described in 1817